Marine Air Detachment (MAD) is a unit in the United States Marine Corps which works in naval aviation operations. The unit is based in Naval Air Station Patuxent River.

References 

United States Marine Corps aviation